Lycius may refer to:
 Lycius (horse)
 Lycius (mythology)
 Lycius (sculptor)
 Lycius (son of Clinis)